Geoffrey White may refer to:

Geoffrey Saxton White (1886–1918), Royal Navy officer
Geoffrey White (British Army officer) (1870–1959), British general

See also
Jeff White (disambiguation)